This is a list of schools in Monmouthshire in Wales.

Primary schools

Archbishop Rowan Williams CW Primary School
Cantref Primary School
Castle Park Primary School
Cross Ash Primary School
The Dell Primary School
Deri View Primary School
Dewstow Primary School
Durand Primary School
Gilwern Primary School
Goytre Fawr Primary School
Kymin View Primary School
Llandogo Primary School
Llanfair Kilgeddin CW Primary School
Llanfoist Primary School
Llantillio Pertholey CW Primary School
Llanvihangel Crucorney Primary School
Magor CW Primary School
Osbaston CW Primary School
Our Lady and St Michael's RC Primary School
Overmonnow Primary School
Pembroke Primary School
Raglan Primary School
Rogiet Primary School
Shirenewton Primary School
St Marys RC Primary School
Thornwell Primary School
Trellech Primary School
Undy Primary School
Usk CW Primary School
Ysgol Gymraeg Y Fenni  ð
Ysgol Gymraeg Y Ffin  ð

ð symbol indicates schools delivering Welsh-medium education

Secondary schools
Caldicot School
Chepstow School
King Henry VIII School Abergavenny
Monmouth Comprehensive School

Special schools
Mounton House Special School

Independent schools
Llangattock School Monmouth
Haberdashers' Monmouth School for Girls
Monmouth School

 
Monmouthshire